The Imja Khola is a tributary of the Dudh Kosi in Nepal. It drains the slopes of Mount Everest. The Khumbu Glacier melts into the Lobujya (Lobuche) River, which flows southward as the Imja Khola to its confluence with the Dudh Kosi at Tengboche.

The Imja Khola collects water from the Imja Glacier through the Dingboche Valley.

River course
The river rises in the lake Imja Tsho, which is mainly formed by the waters of the Imja Glacier, it flows in the direction southwest through the village of Dingboche, then it merges with the river Lobuche, which flows south from the Khumbu Glacier. then flows southward to its confluence with the Dudh Kosi near the village of Tengboche

Trekking
During the Everest Base Camp Trek, trekkers cross a suspension bridge, over the Imja Khola, moving towards the village of Dingboche. Dingboche, the 'Summer Valley; of the Khumbu has a kilometer-long wall built to protect the village's crops from the cold winds that descends down the Imja Valley. The trek is through a Rhododendron forest.

It is also on the trekking route to Chukhung and the Imja Tse or Island peak.

References

External links
 Video of     bridge over Imja Khola
 Pictures of a    hike up the Imja Khola valley
 Map of a    Map of Imja Tse

Rivers of Koshi Province